Montlaur may refer to:

Places
Montlaur is the name or part of the name of several communes in France:
 Montlaur, in the Aude department
 Montlaur, in the Aveyron department
 Montlaur, in the Haute-Garonne department
 Montlaur-en-Diois, in the Drôme department
 Monlaur-Bernet, in the Gers department